Kings Mountain, also commonly called King Mountain, is a prominent  elevation mountain summit located  northeast of Palmer, in the northwestern Chugach Mountains of the U.S. state of Alaska. This landmark of the Matanuska Valley is set between Anchorage and Glennallen, at mile 75 of the Glenn Highway. The mountain was named after Al King, a prospector who had a cabin nearby at the confluence of Kings River and Matanuska River. The name was used by prospectors, reported about 1905 by the U.S. Geological Survey, and officially adopted in 1906 by the U.S. Board on Geographic Names. This peak is known as Bashtl'ech'  in the Denaʼina language, and  Bes Tl'ets'  in the Ahtna language, meaning "black stone".

Climate

Based on the Köppen climate classification, Kings Mountain is located in a subarctic climate zone with long, cold, snowy winters, and mild summers. Weather systems coming off the Gulf of Alaska are forced upwards by the Chugach Mountains (orographic lift), causing heavy precipitation in the form of rainfall and snowfall. Temperatures can drop below −20 °C with wind chill factors below −30 °C. The months May through June offer the most favorable weather for climbing or viewing. Precipitation runoff from the mountain drains into tributaries of the Matanuska River.

See also

Matanuska Formation
Geography of Alaska

References

Gallery

External links
 Kings Mountain: Weather forecast

Mountains of Alaska
Landforms of Matanuska-Susitna Borough, Alaska
Mountains of Matanuska-Susitna Borough, Alaska
North American 1000 m summits
Denaʼina